Melzi was a civitas (town) of the Roman Empire during late antiquity. Melzi may also refer to:

 Francesco Melzi, or Francesco de Melzi (1491–1570), Italian painter born into a family of the Milanese nobility in Lombardy
 Girolamo Melzi (1599–1672), Italian Roman Catholic Bishop of Pavia 
 Francesco Melzi d'Eril, Duke of Lodi, Count of Magenta (1753-1816), Italian politician and patriot
 Jose de Palafox y Melzi (1776-1847), Spanish general who fought in the Peninsular War
 Palazzo Melzi d'Eril, Milan, a neoclassical-style palace located in Milan, region of Lombardy, Italy

See also 
 Villa Melzi d'Eril, several places